Teresa Ribera Rodríguez (born 19 May 1969) is a Spanish jurist, university professor, and politician who has served as the Minister for the Ecological Transition of Spain since 2018, after Prime Minister Pedro Sánchez coming into power following the successful no-confidence motion against Mariano Rajoy. In 2020, she was appointed Fourth Deputy Prime Minister and in 2021 she was promoted to Third Deputy Prime Minister.

Between 2008 and 2011 Ribera held the position of Secretary of State for Climate Change in the second administration of Prime Minister José Luis Rodríguez Zapatero. Between 2014 and 2018, she was director of the Institute of Sustainable Development and International Relations, based in Paris.

Early years and education 
Ribera graduated from the Complutense University of Madrid with a degree in legal studies, with further studies at the Center for Constitutional Studies attaining her another degree in constitutional law and political science.

Early career 
Ribera belongs to the Superior Body of Civil Administrators of the State of which she has been a surplus official since 2012. Ribera has been an associate professor of the Department of Public Law and Philosophy of Law at the Autonomous University of Madrid.

Ribera has held various technical positions in public administration, such as the position of Chief of Coordination of the Ministry of Development and of Technical Adviser in the Cabinet of the Assistant Secretary for the Environment and Head of the Compliance and Development area. Between 2004 and 2008 she was general director of the Office of Climate Change and between 2008 and 2011 she assumed the Secretary of State for Climate Change (in the Ministry of Agriculture and Fisheries, Food and Environment) during the government of president José Luis Rodríguez Zapatero.

International work 
Ribera is also a member of several advisory councils, including the Global Leadership Council of the United Nations Sustainable Development Solutions Network (UNSDSN), the global climate change advisory council of the World Economic Forum, and the Momentum For Change initiative of United Nations Framework Convention on Climate Change (UNFCCC); belongs to the international council of the BC3, to the advisory council of the Institut pour la Recherche du Développement (IRD) and to the patronages of Fundipax and Fundación Alternativas. In September 2013, she began to collaborate with the Institute for Sustainable Development and International Relations (IDDRI), based in Paris, and in June 2014 she assumed its direction. The organization is dedicated to the analysis of strategic issues related to sustainable development, climate change, protection of biodiversity, food security and management of the urbanization process.

In May 2014, the prosecutor's office denounced the development of a gas storage site, called Project Castor, which was halted because of seismic activity. Environmental prevaricación was alleged, and one of the accusations was directed against Teresa Ribera, because when the project was approved by the Government in 2008, she occupied the State Secretariat of Climate Change and was the person who signed the environmental impact assessment by which the project was authorized. In 2015, 18 people were charged from the Geological and Mining Institute of Spain and the General Directorate of Quality and Environmental Evaluation. However, they held posts of a technical nature and no politicians were charged, including Ribera. In 2015, she joined Pedro Sánchez's expert panel to prepare the Socialist Party's electoral program.

Political career

Minister for the Ecological Transition
In June 2018, it was announced that Ribera would be the Minister for the Ecological Transition of the Sánchez government, following the motion of censure that the PSOE presented against the previous government of Mariano Rajoy (PP) and that was approved by the Congress of Deputies. On 1 June 2018, Sánchez appointed her as Minister in new Spanish government. Felipe VI sanctioned by royal decree of June her appointment as holder of the portfolio of Minister for the Ecological Transition. On 7 June she took office as Minister before the King at Palace of Zarzuela.

The first measures that Ribera carried out as minister was to end the so-called "sun tax" to allow the free production of power in an effort to increase  ecological power and to reduce the price of electricity. In an effort to end coal pollution and to transform the power production of Spain, Ribera reached an agreement with unions to close most of the coal mines that still survived in the north of the country by making an investment of €250 million to avoid a fall in the miners’ standard of living  and to restore the environmental balance of the area. 

In a letter sent to their counterparts in the European Commission – Miguel Arias Cañete and Pierre Moscovici – in May 2019, Ribera and Budget Minister María Jesús Montero called on the European Union to assess a potential carbon tax on power imports to protect the bloc’s interests and help it to pursue its environmental targets amid growing public concern over climate change.

Under Ribera's leadership, the Spanish government stepped in to host the 2019 United Nations Climate Change Conference after riots over inequality prompted Chile to withdraw with just one month’s notice.

Deputy Prime Minister
On 13 January 2020, Ribera assumed the office of Fourth Deputy Prime Minister and Minister for the Ecological Transition and Demographic Challenge before the King in Zarzuela Palace in the Sánchez second cabinet. It was the first time in the history of Spain that a government would have four vice-presidencies.

In April 2020, the Prime Minister commissioned Ribera to carry out the plan to ease the lockdown, that is, the way in which the country would exit the State of Alarm activated due to the COVID-19 viral pandemic. For this objective, Ribera organized a group of experts in all areas, from economics to epidemiologists. In statements to EFE news agency in April, Ribera said that the recovery should be done with "green" and "solidary" measures. She then called for a "Green New Deal" for Spain to both further environmentalism and help the country get out of the national lockdown. She stated in May that tourism, which accounts for 12% of Spanish GDP, was of "particular concern" when it came to the impending economic recession in Spain due to the coronavirus.

On 15 December 2020, Ribera was one of the first European ministers to declare that if it was not possible to make the Energy Charter Treaty compatible with the Paris Agreement, there would be no choice but to withdraw from it.

In July 2021, after the resignation of Second DPM Pablo Iglesias, Ribera's post was suppressed and she was appointed Third Deputy Prime Minister.

In May 2021, the Spanish parliament passed the Climate Change and Energy Transition Act.

In late 2021, the cabinet approved Ribera’s 16.3 billion euro energy plan, which is to allocate 6.9 billion euros ($7.8 billion) to renewables, green hydrogen and energy storage over two years and to attract another 9.45 billion euros in private funding under its COVID-19 recovery plan.

Ribera, along with Shauna Aminath, led the working group at the 2022 United Nations Climate Change Conference that facilitated consultations on mitigation.

Recognition  
 2018 – Climate Reality Project Award in the category of 'Public Personality', awarded by the Climate Reality Project

See also 

 List of Complutense University of Madrid people

References

1969 births
21st-century Spanish politicians
21st-century Spanish women politicians
Complutense University of Madrid alumni
Deputy Prime Ministers of Spain
Government ministers of Spain
Living people
Members of the 13th Congress of Deputies (Spain)
Academic staff of the Autonomous University of Madrid
Spanish jurists
Environment ministers of Spain
Spanish Socialist Workers' Party politicians
Women government ministers of Spain
Women members of the Congress of Deputies (Spain)
Members of the 14th Congress of Deputies (Spain)